A mastiff is a large and powerful type of dog. Mastiffs are among the largest dogs, and typically have a short coat, a long low-set tail and large feet; the skull is large and bulky, the muzzle broad and short (brachycephalic) and the ears drooping and pendant-shaped. European and Asian records dating back 3,000 years show dogs of the mastiff type. Mastiffs have historically been guard dogs, protecting homes and property, although throughout history they have been used as hunting dogs, war dogs and for blood sports, such as fighting each other and other animals, including bulls, bears and even lions.

Biology
Historical and archaeological evidence suggests that mastiffs have long been distinct in both form and function from the similarly large livestock guardian dogs from which they were most likely developed; they also form separate genetic populations. The Fédération Cynologique Internationale and some kennel clubs group the two types together as molossoid dogs; some modern livestock guardian breeds, such as the Pyrenean Mastiff, the Spanish Mastiff and the Tibetan Mastiff, and an extinct draught dog called the Belgian Mastiff, have the word "mastiff" in their name, but are not considered true mastiffs.  Tibetan Mastiffs have been sold for over $1 million in China.

Many older English sources refer to mastiffs as bandogs or bandogges, although technically the term "bandog" meant a dog that was tethered by a chain (or "bande") that would be released at night; the terms "mastiff" and "bandog" were often used interchangeably. In the twentieth century the term "bandog" was revived to describe some large fighting dogs in the United States.

List of mastiff breeds

Extant breeds

Extinct breeds

References

Bibliography

 
 
 
 
 
 
 

Dog types